Donnell Whittenburg (born August 18, 1994) is an American artistic gymnast whose strongest events are rings, vault, and floor.

Early life
Whittenburg is from central Baltimore, Maryland.

Career
Whittenburg won a bronze medal at the 2014 World Artistic Gymnastics Championships. He was the 2014 U.S. National champion on Vault and is the 2015 U.S. national champion on rings. At the 2014 World Artistic Gymnastics Championships, Whittenburg won the bronze medal in the team event with the Americans, and contributed scored on floor exercise (15.300), still rings (14.766), vault (14.966) and parallel bars (14.633). At the 2015 World Artistic Gymnastics Championships, he won the individual bronze medal on vault with an average combined score of 15.350 behind Ri Se Gwang of North Korea (15.450) and Marian Drăgulescu of Romania (15.400). He also qualified for the individual still rings event final but finished in eight place with 15.300. At the 2017 London World Cup, Whittenburg won gold in that all-around competition, and at the 2017 Koper World Challenge Cup, the individual apparatus competition, in Slovenia, Whittenburg won gold on parallel bars, and silvers on floor and vault.

In 2022 he placed second in the United States men's all around behind Brody Malone, scoring highest in rings and second highest on vault. At the 2022 World Challenge Cup in Paris he won bronze medal on parallel bars and rings.

Named skill
Whittenburg has one skill in gymnastics named after him in the 2022–2024 Code of Points, the salto backwards piked on still rings. The Whittenburg dismount has the highest difficulty score (D-score) in still rings at H (0.8).

Competitive history

References

External links 
 
 

Living people
1994 births
African-American male gymnasts
American male artistic gymnasts
Gymnasts at the 2015 Pan American Games
Medalists at the World Artistic Gymnastics Championships
Pan American Games gold medalists for the United States
Pan American Games medalists in gymnastics
Pan American Games silver medalists for the United States
Sportspeople from Baltimore
Medalists at the 2015 Pan American Games
Originators of elements in artistic gymnastics
21st-century African-American sportspeople